Aquagen is a German electronic dance music duo, consisting of Gino Montesano and Olaf Dieckmann. They initially achieved success with their single "Ihr Seid So Leise" ("Why Are You So Quiet?"), which sold more than 250,000 copies in Germany.

Discography

Studio albums
 Abgehfaktor (2000)
 Weekender (2002)
 Nightliner (2002)

Compilation albums
 So Far So Good (The Very Best Of) (2009)

Singles
 "Ihr Seid So Leise" (1999)
 "Party Alarm" (2000)
 "Phatt Bass" (2000) (vs. Warp Brothers) - UK #9
 "Tanz Für Mich" (2000) (feat. Ingo Appelt)
 "Lovemachine" (2000)
 "Hard to Say I'm Sorry" (2002) - UK #33
 "Everybody's Free" (2002) (feat. Rozalla)
 "Summer Is Calling" (2002)
 "Girl (Uhh Uhh Yeah Yeah)" (2004)
 "The Pipes Are Calling" (2006)
 "Blade" (2008) (Ali Payami vs. Aquagen & Warp Brothers)
 "Hard to Say I'm Sorry 2K9" (2009)
 "Ihr Seid So Leise! 2011 (scheisse, scheisse leise)" (2011)
 "Sirens" (2013) (feat. Romez & Damark)

References

External links
 Official website
 
 

German dance music groups
German trance music groups
German electronic music groups
German musical duos
Electronic dance music duos